
"Birpurush" (English:The Hero) is a Bengali poem written by Rabindranath Tagore. The poem depicts a child fantasising that he saves his mother from dacoits.

In the evening, when the sun is set, the child and his mother reach a barren place. There is not a single soul there. Even the cattle have returned home. Plodding silence reigns there. The mother is a bit afraid and wonders where they have arrived. The child reassures her and tells her that there is a small river ahead. The mother sees a shimmering light and asks her son about it. Suddenly, they hear the cry "Ha re, re re, re re" as a band of dacoits attacks their caravan. The mother shivers inside the palanquin; the palanquin-bearers hide in the bush. The son reassures his mother and confronts the dacoits courageously. A fight follows, in which the son emerges victorious. The son returns to his mother, who kisses his forehead and thanks him.

The imagination now turns from this event as the poet wonders why some exciting thing like this does not actually happen in the mundane course of everyday life. The poet contemplates that it would be like an adventure story that would fascinate everybody.

Notes

References

External links 
 Birpurush full poetry in Bengali and English
 Famous Poets and Poems

Indian poems
Bengali-language poems
Poems by Rabindranath Tagore